Matthew Victor Kopp, who performs as Running Touch, is an Australian singer, songwriter and record producer. In addition to his eponymous solo project, he was the founding guitarist of Australian nu metal band, Ocean Grove in 2010, and since 2014 he is a studio-only member. He appears on both their albums, The Rhapsody Tapes (February 2017) and Flip Phone Fantasy (March 2020). He also contributed written material for Adult Art Club.

Career
Running Touch's debut extended play, A Body Slow, was issued in April 2017 via Island Records Australia/Universal Music Australia, which peaked at No. 31 on the ARIA Digital Albums Chart and No. 1 on the related Hitseekers Albums Chart. Kopp explained to Benjamin Potter of Beat magazine, his use of a pseudonym, "at the start it was all about a personal decision – I didn't want the project to be based on... what I look like, who I am, my past... I didn't think Running Touch was going to be so successful." His single, "My Hands" (July 2018), which reached No. 12 on the ARIA Club Tracks Chart, was certified gold by ARIA for shipment of 35000 units in Australia, in August 2019.

In November 2018 he was featured on the single, "Better Together", by Hayden James. The track reached No. 63 on the ARIA Singles Chart, placed number 78 in that year's Triple J Hottest 100. At the APRA Music Awards of 2020 Running Touch (as Matthew Kopp) won Most Performed Dance Work of the Year for "Better Together", which he co-wrote.

In February 2022 Running Touch announced his debut album, Carmine, was scheduled for 6 May.

Discography

Studio albums

Extended plays

Singles

As lead artist

As featured artist

Notes

Awards

APRA Awards

The APRA Awards are held in Australia and New Zealand by the Australasian Performing Right Association to recognise songwriting skills, sales and airplay performance by its members annually. Running Touch has been nominated for one award (with Hayden James).

|-
| 2020
| "Better Together"  (with Hayden James)
| Most Performed Dance Work of the Year
| 
|-

References

Living people
APRA Award winners
Australian DJs
Australian record producers
Year of birth missing (living people)